Posterior spinal veins are small veins which receive blood from the dorsal spinal cord.

References

External links
 http://sci.rutgers.edu/index.php?page=viewarticle&afile=10_January_2002@SCIschemia.html

Veins of the torso